Yvonne Porcella (May 12, 1936 – February 12, 2016) was an American art quilter.

Life
Yvonne Bechis was born in Watsonville, California, United States on May 12, 1936. She graduated in 1958 with a BS in Public Health and an RN from the University of San Francisco, and worked as an operating room nurse. That same year, she married Robert S. Porcella, a general practice physician.

Porcella was a self taught quilter. Her works included paintings, weaving, pieced clothing, and art quilts. Her quilts were known for bold colors, and black and white checkerboards or stripes, and unusual titles such as It's About Beets & Perfume and Non Fat, Low Cholesterol, Chemically Enhanced Frozen Dairy Dessert.

Porcella founded Studio Art Quilt Associates, Inc. in 1989 and served as its president for 11 years.

Porcella's work can be found in the Los Angeles County Museum of Art,Fine Arts Museums of San Francisco, the Renwick Gallery at the Smithsonian American Art Museum,  the National Quilt Museum, and the Museum of Arts and Design. Her quilt Keep Both Feet on the Floor, was exhibited in a major review of 20th century quilts.

Porcella was inducted into the Quilters Hall of Fame (Marion, Indiana) in 1998 and was awarded a Silver Star by the International Quilt Association. In 2012, she had a retrospective as Distinguished Artist, at the Carnegie Arts Center.

Porcella died on February 12, 2016, in Modesto. She and her husband had four children.

Published works
Yvonne Porcella: a colorful book, Porcella Studios, 1986, 
Colors changing hue, C&T Publishing, 1994, 
Six Color World: Color, Cloth, Quilts & Wearables, C&T Publishing, 1997, 
Art & Inspirations, C&T Publishing, 1998, 
Magical Four-Patch And Nine-Patch Quilts, C&T Publishing, 2010,

Exhibits
Art Quilts from the Collection of the Museum of Arts & Design, 2004, American Textile History Museum, included Porcella's Snow on Mount Fuji (1985)
Women of Taste: A Collaboration Celebrating Quilt Artists and Chefs, 2000, Oakland Museum, Oakland, California; Porcella collaborated with Julia Child on the subject of Nicoise salad
Iconic to Ironic: Fashioning California Identity, 2003, Oakland Museum, Oakland, California
Yvonne Porcella: Fifty Years an Artist, 2016, Visions Art Museum, San Diego, California
Artwear: Fashion and Anti-Fashion, 2005, Fine Arts Museums of San Francisco

References
Yvonne Porcella, A Memoir: Defining Why, Porcella Studios, 2014,

External links
Interview with Yvonne Porcella
 Go Tell It at the Quilt Show! interview with Yvonne Porcella,

Quilters
1936 births
2016 deaths